Béchir Bouazzat (5 October 1908 – 12 April 1944) was a French modern pentathlete of Tunisian descent. He competed at the 1936 Summer Olympics. He was killed during World War II.

References

1908 births
1944 deaths
French male modern pentathletes
Olympic modern pentathletes of France
Modern pentathletes at the 1936 Summer Olympics
Sportspeople from Tunis
French civilians killed in World War II
Friendly fire incidents of World War II